The 1948–49 season was the 48th year of competitive football played by Southampton F.C., the club's 22nd season as members of the Football League, and their 20th competing in the Second Division. The Saints finished the campaign in third place in the league table, having gained 55 from a possible 84 points with 23 wins, nine draws and ten losses. The club also competed in the FA Cup, but lost their only fixture in the third round against fellow Second Division side Sheffield Wednesday.

After a strong second half of the 1947–48 season which saw the club finish third in the league table, Southampton continued with the same squad and brought in just one summer signing, Spanish winger José Gallego. The club also sold centre-forward George Lewis to Brighton & Hove Albion, winger Billy Wrigglesworth to Reading, and goalkeeper George Ephgrave to Norwich City. Partway through the season, George Beattie moved to Gloucester City, and the club signed Bill Heaton from Leeds United to cover the team's outside-left position. The 1948–49 season was the last to feature manager Bill Dodgin, who left to join Fulham before the next season.

During the season, 21 players appeared for Southampton in all competitions. Centre-half Eric Webber featured in more games than any other player, being ever present in both the league and FA Cup with 43 appearances. Centre-forward Charlie Wayman finished as Southampton's top scorer with 32 goals in the league – the highest of any division in the Football League that season. The club attracted an average home league attendance at The Dell of 25,465 – almost 5,000 more than the previous year. The highest league attendance was 30,586 in the final home fixture of the season against fellow promotion contenders West Bromwich Albion, which remained the club's record attendance for more than 20 years. The lowest attendance of the season was 20,937 on New Year's Day 1948 against Cardiff City – higher than the 1947–48 average.

Second Division

Season summary
Southampton's third post-war season started strongly, as they picked up four wins from their opening five fixtures to go straight to the top of the league table – the first game of the campaign was a 3–0 victory over Blackburn Rovers, who had just been relegated from the First Division. The team's form dropped off quickly though, as they won just once (at home to eventual champions Fulham) out of their next six games, in a run which ended in successive losses at Sheffield Wednesday and Barnsley, resulting in a descent to sixth in the league table – the lowest they would be all season. During this period, manager Bill Dodgin claimed that some of the players had a "half-hearted attitude". Squad challenges meant that the Saints struggled to find stability in the outside-left position, deploying eight different players there during the first half of the season.

Despite these difficulties, after dropping to sixth, Southampton went on an unbeaten run of seven games between early October and late November to firmly establish their place in the top three – highlights included a 5–2 win at home to Coventry City, a season-record 6–0 victory over Leicester City in which Charlie Wayman scored five times (the first time a Southampton player had done so in the Football League), and a 3–1 win over fellow promotion hopefuls Tottenham Hotspur. Four wins from the last six fixtures of the calendar year saw the Saints moving up to second in the table by the end of December, as West Bromwich Albion and Spurs dropped points to close the gap to just two points between the three teams fighting for the two promotion spots. On 1 January 1949, Southampton moved back up to the top spot for the first time since the beginning of September with a 2–0 win over Cardiff City. At a friendly against Plymouth Argyle a couple of weeks later, Alf Ramsey picked up a knee injury which kept him out of action for the rest of the season.

Another unbeaten run of 12 matches between the end of December and the beginning of April saw the Saints secure an eight-point lead at the top of the league table, becoming "clear favourites" for promotion. Charlie Wayman continued to lead the team's goal-scoring, while the club also signed Bill Heaton to take over the contentious outside-left position. Wins during the unbeaten run included 3–1 away against Queens Park Rangers, 1–0 over Sheffield Wednesday, and 1–0 away over Tottenham Hotspur. Despite their dominance, Southampton lost their lead at the top of the table with unexpected losses against Bradford Park Avenue, West Ham United and Bury, the latter of which saw a Ted Bates goal controversially disallowed for offside. The side picked up only one win and one draw from their final seven games, attracting a new club record attendance of 30,826 in the penultimate game against West Bromwich Albion; after this game, both West Brom and Fulham had decisive fixtures in hand, leaving Southampton powerless in their quest for promotion.

Losing to Chesterfield in their final game, Southampton remained second in the table, however Fulham's draw with Tottenham saw them move ahead on goal average, and when West Brom won their final two games, the Saints dropped to third and lost out on promotion to the top flight. A feature in local newspaper the Southern Daily Echo described the conclusion of the season as "the end of a tragic slide which must be almost without parallel in football". Charlie Wayman finished as the top goalscorer for the Second Division and the Football League overall in 1948–49, with 32 goals in 37 league appearances. This was Southampton's final season with Bill Dodgin as manager, who suddenly left a few weeks into the 1949–50 pre-season to take over at league champions Fulham, and was replaced by his assistant Sid Cann.

Final league table

Results by matchday

Match reports

FA Cup
Sheffield Wednesday 
Southampton entered the 1948–49 FA Cup in the third round, travelling to face fellow Second Division side Sheffield Wednesday four months after losing 0–2 to them in the league. Despite enjoying the share of chances on goal, the Saints went behind after 25 minutes when Jimmy Dailey converted a "precision cross" from Dennis Woodhead. Only six minutes later, however, the visitors equalised through a 25-yard shot from Wilf Grant; it remained level going into half-time, after goalkeeper Ian Black made a "sensational" save from a Redfern Froggatt effort. The hosts slowly took control of the game in the second half, and in the 68th minute made it 2–1 through Eddie Quigley. Joe Mallett almost scored at the end, but Sheffield goalkeeper Dave McIntosh denied him and it ended with the visitors exiting the tournament.

Additional friendly
Southampton played one friendly during the 1948–49 season, beating fellow Second Division side Plymouth Argyle 1–0 on 15 January 1949, the only goal scored by José Gallego.

Squad statistics

Most appearances

Top goalscorers

Transfers

References

Bibliography

Southampton F.C. seasons
Southampton